Songgang station is a station of Line 6 and Line 11 of the Shenzhen Metro. Line 11 platforms opened on 28 June 2016 and Line 6 platforms opened on 18 August 2020.

Station layout

Exits

Gallery

References

Railway stations in Guangdong
Shenzhen Metro stations
Bao'an District
Railway stations in China opened in 2016